Plumegesta callidalis is a moth in the family Crambidae. It is found on the Bahamas.

References

Moths described in 1901
Glaphyriinae